Tritent International Corp. v. Commonwealth of Kentucky, 467 F.3d 547 (6th Cir. 2006), is a US antitrust law case decided by the Court of Appeals on the Sixth Circuit. The case is notable, inter alia, because it provides a summary of the difficult terms of the Tobacco Master Settlement Agreement.

Facts
In order to give effect to the Tobacco Master Settlement Agreement (MSA), Kentucky enacted an Escrow Statute, Ky. Rev. Stat. Ann. § 131.602, and a Contraband Statute, Ky. Rev. Stat. Ann. § 131.610. Plaintiffs (a Brazilian cigarette manufacturer, an importer, and a Kentucky wholesaler) did not participate in the MSA, and argued that the two statutes collectively authorized anticompetitive behavior. Plaintiffs asserted that the legislation punished nonparticipating manufacturers and rewarded subsequent participating manufacturers—a practice that constituted an illegal per se output cartel.
Plaintiffs  sought review of an order from the United States District Court for the Eastern District of Kentucky at Frankfort granting defendant Commonwealth of Kentucky's Fed. R. Civ. P. 12(b)(6) motion to dismiss plaintiffs' lawsuit.  They alleged that Ky. Rev. Stat. Ann. §§ 131.602, 131.610 were preempted by the SHERMAN Act, 15 U.S.C.S. § 1 et seq.

The Court summarized the facts as follows.

Judgment
The court held that the legislation was not subject to SHERMAN Act preemption because plaintiffs failed to establish that the legislation mandated or authorized illegal behavior in all cases. The fact that the volume-based payment scale in the MSA and in Ky. Rev. Stat. Ann. § 131.602(2)(b) (2004) influenced the participating manufacturers to raise their prices and lower their output was not enough to satisfy the first prong of the Rice preemption analysis. The court also concluded that plaintiffs' failure to show preemption precluded consideration of their hybrid-restraint claim.

See also
US antitrust law

Notes

Legal history of Kentucky
United States antitrust case law
United States tobacco case law
United States Court of Appeals for the Sixth Circuit cases
2006 in United States case law
2006 in Kentucky